Lairembigee Eshei (lit. Song of the Goddess), also known as Song of the Nymphs, is a Meitei language play, written and directed by Ratan Thiyam, performed by the "Chorus Repertoire Theatre" of Imphal.
It was shown as a closing play at the 21st Bharat Rang Mahotsav at Kamani Hall in Delhi.
It was staged on the concluding day of the 9th National Prayas Natya Mela. 
It was also staged as the concluding event of the three-day State conference on theatre organised by the Network of Artistic Theatre Activists Kerala (NATAK) in Kochi, Kerala.

The play shows the lifestyle of mankind in the 21st century, when globalisation, worldwide mobility, communication and information are at the peak. It also shows the significance of identity, tradition, and preservation of culture even in modern eras. It attempts to remind the audiences about the challenges faced by ancestral rituals and traditions in the society.

Plot 
Seven nymphs have been flying around the world to see the changes in nature, environment and human society. The peace of sky, earth, water, trees, men make the nymphs fly towards the era of the 22nd century.
The seven nymphs, in purely white dresses, having white lighting, slowly carry large dishes and dance gently, in accordance to the tinkling melodies. 
The nymphs wave their scarves and made illusions of flying across the sky. When they find out a king who is wailing after destroying nature by himself, they get to know about the importance of the protection of nature. 
The nymphs are shown in as entering into the underwater world, by covering their faces. At a time, some bird catchers attempt to capture the nymphs, by using their nets. However, they can't succeed and they are laughed at by the nymphs. 
The nymphs move around gigantic stalks of lotus, lotus leaves and lotus buds, representing the destruction of nature by human beings in metaphorical way. 
In the final scene, the seven nymphs climb on the seven steps. Each nymph has a white umbrella held over their heads. The umbrellas represent peace leaves an indestructible and unforgettable impression.

Cast and Credits 
 Indira as Chingaleima Takhengbi
 Russia as Lanjinleima Piyainu
 Taruni as Hayenkhombi	
 Anjelina as Shaleima
 Shandhyarani as Uleima
 Jaya as Heibongkhombi	
 Rojita as Shananu	
 P. Somo as Ningthou
 Ibomcha Sorok as Wangban Shaphaba
 Robindro as Meitreng Araba
 Nongdamba as Thengraiba
 Lokendra as Chengheiba
 Anish / Inaoba as Manai-I	
 Ajitkumar as Manai-II
 Nongdamba as Shadanba-I
 Ajitkumar as Shadanba-II
 Lokendra as Shadanba-III
 Robindro as Shadanba-VI
 Stage Management by Robindro
 Set & Props by Nongdamba, Ajitkumar, Anish/ Inaoba
 Costume by Somo, Somorjit, Tarubi, Russia, Rojita, Shandhyarani, Indira
 Music Assistance by L. Tomba, Basanta, Somorjit
 Light Assistance by Thawai Thiyam, Angoutombi, Ibomcha Sorok
 Consultance by N. Amusana Devi, W. Keinatombi Leima
 Production Management by Ibomcha Sorok
 Assistant Direction by Thawai Thiyam
 Script, Music, Design & Direction by Ratan Thiyam

Reception 
Padma Shri awardee Indian professor Sunil Kothari commented on the play and the director's performance as follows:

See also 
 Yamata Amasung Keibu Keioiba

Notes

References

External links 

 
 
 

Meitei cultural plays
Meitei folklore in popular culture
Meitei language plays
Meitei mythology in popular culture